Founded by four friends in 2005, Low Strung comprises a group of 12 undergraduate students at Yale University, all of whom are classically trained cellists. Since the group's beginning, Low Strung has proudly carried on a tradition of musical excellence and camaraderie as the greatest all-cello rock group of our generation. As such, Low Strung transforms classic songs into modern works of ingenuity and beauty designed exclusively for the cello.

All of Low Strung's arrangements are written by its members. Since its founding, Low Strung has written over 50 arrangements and has released several CD albums. The group takes music from every decade and every genre – rock, pop, metal, blues – and the final product is something unique that cannot be found anywhere else: music that bursts with the excitement of rock, complemented by the thundering bass and butter-smooth voice of the cello. Low Strung's repertoire is exhilarating, challenging, nostalgic, diverse, and most importantly, fun! Audience favorites include Livin’ On a Prayer by Bon Jovi, Toxic by Britney Spears, Fix You by Coldplay, Yesterday by The Beatles, Beat It by Michael Jackson, and songs from dozens of other artists, including The Beach Boys, The Rolling Stones, Queen, The Who, Metallica, Led Zeppelin, Bob Marley, Taylor Swift, and Lady Gaga. Other audience favorites include arrangements in which we combine themes from unlikely musical forces – Beethoven with The Eagles, J.S. Bach with Amy Winehouse, and Gabriel Fauré with The Turtles. Low Strung has shared stages with the likes of Glenn Frey from the Eagles.

Low Strung’s presence can be felt on and off campus. On campus, Low Strung performs for students, teachers, and residents from the local community. Beyond campus, the group has had the opportunity to share its distinctive sound across the country in New York, Boston, Los Angeles, Washington D.C., Chicago, and Las Vegas. They have also had the opportunity to perform internationally at the Montreux Jazz Festival in Geneva, Switzerland in 2015 and at the 26th Annual Credomatic Music Festival in Costa Rica in 2016.

Low Strung has also played countless times at schools, retirement homes, hospitals, weddings, galas, night clubs, concert halls, private events, and everything in between. However, it does not matter where they play. The members of Low Strung are content wherever they share their music and inspire lives, both young and old. Because Low Strung understands that music is a language that bridges cultures, societies, and generations, the group strives to inspire the next generation of composers, musicians, and leaders through their performances. By seamlessly fusing tradition and innovation through the mediums of classical and rock music, Low Strung provides audience members with a truly charismatic and unforgettable concert experience.

Discography

Low Strung has released 2 CDS to date. Its first, Low Strung, was released in 2007, and its most recent, Quadruple Moon, was released in 2014.

The group was created in 2004 with six inaugural members. As of 2014 they have 12 members.

References

External links

Rock cellists
Musical groups established in 2005